René-François Régnier (17 July 1794 – 3 January 1881, Rome) was a French cardinal.

Biography

Cardinal Rengnier was born on 17 July 1794 at Saint-Quentin-les Beaurepaire in the region of Cambrai, France. His parents were François Régnier and Renée Périgois. He was ordained a priest on 22 December 1818. He was consecrated bishop of the Diocese of Angoulême by his predecessor Cardinal Pierre Giraud on 22 July 1842, and succeeded him as archbishop of the Cambrai on 30 September 1850.

Pope Pius IX created him as the Cardinal-Priest of Santissima Trinità dei Monti on 22 December 1873. He died on 3 January 1881 and was buried at the Cathedral of Cambrai.

See also

 Roman Catholic Archdiocese of Cambrai
 Roman Catholic Diocese of Angoulême

References

External links
The Cardinals of the Holy Roman Church

|-

|-

|-

|-

1794 births
1881 deaths
19th-century French cardinals
Cardinals created by Pope Pius IX
Archbishops of Cambrai
Bishops of Angoulême